Mohamed Abdel-Galil is a former Egyptian international midfielder. He spent his playing career with Zamalek SC and Al-Ahly.

Mohamed made some appearances for the Egypt national football team, including 1994 African Nations Cup matches.

References

External links
 
 

Living people
Egyptian footballers
Egypt international footballers
Egyptian football managers
1968 births
Place of birth missing (living people)
Association football midfielders